"Bachata" is a song by Lou Bega. It was the first single from his third album Lounatic. The song features background vocals by the Ukrainian girl group Alibi. The song is about dancing bachata on a party and the erotic effect of this dance.

Chart performance

Track listing
CD single
 "Bachata" (Radio Mix) - 3:22
 "Why Don't You" - 3:10

Maxi single
 "Bachata" (Radio Mix) - 3:22
 "Bachata" (Acoustic Mix) - 3:09
 "Bachata" (Tommy Gunn Remix) - 3:28
 "Bachata" (Latin Version) - 3:10
 "Bachata" (Club Version) - 3:24
 "Why Don't You" - 3:10

Special French edition
 "Bachata" (Radio Mix) - 3:22
 "Bachata" (Acoustic Mix) - 3:09
 "Return of "A Little Bit"" - 3:49
 "Bachata" (Music Video) - 3:22

References

2006 singles
Lou Bega songs
2005 songs
Songs written by Lou Bega